Livingetc is a magazine focusing on modern interior design published by Future plc.

History 
The magazine began publication in 1998 in London, England and specializes in the interiors market for minimalist living.

Current 
Livingetc is a British modern homes magazine featuring houses from around the world, interior trends, decorating ideas and designers. It is edited by Pip Rich, whose pre-married name was Pip McCormac. He has previously worked at ELLE Decoration, Red, Sunday Times Style and Grazia.

It features columnists Minnie Kemp and Ruth Mottershead. Jonathan Adler was the first guest editor overseeing the June 2021 issue.

Other ventures 
As well as publishing the magazine, Livingetc sells lighting, furniture and fabrics. It previously launched Livingetc Home, a collection of furniture and accessories. The magazine made Livingetc TV, a 15-part series for Discovery Travel & Living, and created a series of CDs with The Big Chill (music festival), Buddha Bar, Momo’s Kemia Bar and Sketch (restaurant) and bar. In 2009, a Livingetc Paint range was developed and sold through the UK DIY superstore B&Q.

Notable contributors 
Linda Boronkay and Poppy Okotcha have been monthly columnists.

Jamie Oliver was a cookery contributor in the early years and had his first two homes photographed for the magazine. Sir Terence Conran had his house photographed in the October 2006 issue. The magazine has featured the homes of actresses Courteney Cox and Rachel Griffiths, radio presenter Jamie Theakston, and designer Sebastian Conran.

Livingetc website 
Livingetc’s website, Livingetc.com, was launched in 2005 as an extension of the magazine.

References

External links
  Official Livingetc web site
  Official Future plc website

Design magazines
Lifestyle magazines published in the United Kingdom
Magazines established in 1998
Magazines published in London
Monthly magazines published in the United Kingdom
Women's magazines published in the United Kingdom